Madeline Clair Hughes Haikala (born November 4, 1964) is a United States district judge of the United States District Court for the Northern District of Alabama.

Biography

Haikala was born Madeline Clair Hughes in 1964, in New Orleans, Louisiana. She received her Bachelor of Arts degree in 1986 from Williams College. She received her Juris Doctor in 1989 from Tulane University Law School, graduating Order of the Coif. She worked in private practice from 1989 until 2011, serving at the law firm of Lightfoot, Franklin & White LLC in Birmingham, Alabama, handling a broad range of commercial litigation at the trial and appellate levels, before state and federal courts. From 1998 to 2005, she taught Appellate Law at Cumberland School of Law as an adjunct professor. She served as a United States magistrate judge in the Northern District of Alabama from 2012 to 2013.

Federal judicial service

On May 9, 2013, President Barack Obama nominated Haikala to serve as a United States District Judge of the United States District Court for the Northern District of Alabama, to the seat vacated by Judge Inge Prytz Johnson, who assumed senior status on October 24, 2012. She received a hearing before the Senate Judiciary Committee on June 19, 2013, and her nomination was reported to the floor of the Senate on July 18, 2013, by a voice vote. The Senate confirmed her nomination on October 14, 2013, by a 90–0 vote. She received her commission on October 16, 2013.

Judge Haikala’s former law clerks have gone on to clerk for Circuit Judges on the United States Courts of Appeals for the First, Third, Fifth, Eleventh, and D.C. Circuits.

References

External links

1964 births
Living people
American women lawyers
Judges of the United States District Court for the Northern District of Alabama
Lawyers from New Orleans
Tulane University Law School alumni
United States district court judges appointed by Barack Obama
21st-century American judges
United States magistrate judges
Williams College alumni
21st-century American women judges